Sir Archibald David Stirling  (15 November 1915 – 4 November 1990) was a Scottish Officer in the British Army, a mountaineer, and the founder and creator of the Special Air Service (SAS). He saw active service during the Second World War.

Early life 
Stirling was born at his family's ancestral home, Keir House, in the parish of Lecropt, Perthshire on 15 November 1915. He was the son of Brigadier-General Archibald Stirling, of Keir, and Margaret Fraser, daughter of Simon Fraser, the Lord Lovat (a descendant of Charles II). Simon Fraser, 15th Lord Lovat was a first cousin. His paternal grandparents were Sir William Stirling-Maxwell, 9th Baronet and Lady Anna Maria Leslie-Melville.

Stirling was educated at the Catholic boarding school Ampleforth College, but attended only a year at Trinity College, Cambridge before departing to Paris to become an artist. At  with an athletic figure, Stirling was training to climb Mount Everest when the Second World War broke out.

Second World War and the founding of the SAS 
Stirling was commissioned into the Scots Guards from Ampleforth College Contingent Officer Training Corps on 24 July 1937. In June 1940, he volunteered for the new No. 8 (Guards) Commando under Lieutenant-Colonel Robert Laycock, which became part of Force Z (later named "Layforce"). On 1 February 1941, Layforce sailed for the Middle East, in support of the capture of Rhodes, but were soon disbanded after suffering heavy casualties in the Battle of Crete and the Battle of the Litani River. Stirling remained convinced that due to the mechanised nature of war, a small team of highly trained soldiers with the advantage of surprise could attack several targets from the desert in a single night.

Believing that taking his idea up the chain of command was unlikely to work, Stirling decided to go straight to the top. On crutches following a parachuting accident, he stealthily entered Middle East headquarters in Cairo (under, through, or over a fence) in an effort to see Commander-in-Chief, Middle East Command General Sir Claude Auchinleck. Spotted by guards, Stirling abandoned his crutches and entered the building, only to come face-to-face with an officer with whom he had previously fallen out. Retreating rapidly, he entered the office of the deputy chief of staff, Major General Neil Ritchie. Stirling explained his plan to Ritchie, immediately after which Ritchie persuaded Auchinleck to allow Stirling to form a new special operations unit. The unit was given the deliberately misleading name "L Detachment, Special Air Service Brigade" to reinforce Dudley Clarke's deception of a parachute brigade existing in North Africa.

Stirling's new special operations unit was, at the outset, short of equipment (particularly tents and related gear) when the unit set up at Kibrit Air Base. The first operation of the new SAS was to steal from a nearby well-equipped New Zealand regiment various supplies including tents, bedding, tables, chairs and a piano. After at least four trips, they had a well-stocked camp.

After a brief period of training, an initial attempt at attacking a German airfield by parachute landing on 16 November 1941 in support of Operation Crusader proved to be disastrous for the unit. Of the original 55 men, some 34 were killed, wounded or captured far from the target, after being blown off course or landing in the wrong area, during one of the biggest storms to hit the region. Escaping only with the help of the Long Range Desert Group (LRDG) – who were designated to pick up the unit after the attack – Stirling agreed that approaching by land under the cover of night would be safer and more effective than parachuting. As quickly as possible he organised raids on ports using this simple method, bluffing through checkpoints at night using the language skills of some of his soldiers.

Under Stirling's leadership, the Lewes bomb, the first hand-held dual explosive and incendiary device, was invented by Jock Lewes. American Jeeps, which were able to deal with the harsh desert terrain better than other transport, were cut down, adapted and fitted with Vickers K machine guns fore and aft. Stirling also pioneered the use of small groups to escape detection. Finding it difficult to lead from the rear, Stirling often led from the front, his SAS units driving through enemy airfields in the Jeeps to shoot up aircraft and crew.

The first Jeep-borne airfield raid occurred soon after acquiring the first batch of Jeeps in June 1942, when Stirling's SAS group attacked the Italian-held Bagush airfield along with two other Axis airfields all in the same night. After returning to Cairo, Stirling collected a consignment of more Jeeps for further airfield raids. His biggest success was on the night of 26–27 July 1942 when his SAS squadron, armed with 18 jeeps, raided the Sidi Haneish landing strip and destroyed 37 Axis aircraft  (mostly bombers and heavy transport) for the loss of two men killed. After a drive through the desert, evading enemy patrols and aircraft, Stirling and his men reached the safety of their advance camp at Qaret Tartura on the edge of the Qattara Depression. He was promoted to lieutenant-colonel in September 1942. 

These hit-and-run operations eventually proved Stirling's undoing; he was captured by the Germans in January 1943 having been dubbed "The Phantom Major" by Field Marshal Erwin Rommel. Although Stirling  escaped his capture by the Germans, he was subsequently re-captured by the Italians, who took great delight in the embarrassment this caused to their German allies. He made four further escape attempts, before he was sent to Colditz Castle, where he remained as a prisoner for the rest of the war. He arrived on 20 August 1944 and was given the task of setting up the Colditz British Intelligence Unit.
Following Stirling's capture Paddy Mayne took command of the SAS.

In North Africa, in the 15 months before Stirling's capture, the SAS had destroyed over 250 aircraft on the ground, dozens of supply dumps, wrecked railways and telecommunications, and had put hundreds of enemy vehicles out of action. Field Marshal Montgomery of Alamein described Stirling as "mad, quite mad".

Private military company 
Worried that Britain was losing its power after the war, Stirling organised deals to provide British weapons and military personnel to other countries, like Saudi Arabia, for various privatised foreign policy operations. Along with several associates, Stirling formed Watchguard International Ltd, formerly with offices in Sloane Street (where the Chelsea Hotel later opened) before moving to South Audley Street in Mayfair.

Business was chiefly with the Gulf States. He was linked, along with Denys Rowley, to a failed attempt to overthrow the Libyan ruler Muammar Gaddafi in 1970 or 1971. Stirling was the founder of private military company KAS International, also known as KAS Enterprises.

Watchguard International Ltd was a private military company, registered in Jersey in 1965 by Stirling and John Woodhouse. Woodhouse's first assignment was to go to Yemen to report on the state of the royalist forces when a cease-fire was declared. At the same time Stirling was cultivating his contacts in the Iranian government and exploring the chances of obtaining work in Africa. The company operated in Zambia and in Sierra Leone, providing training teams and advising on security matters, but its founders' maverick ways of doing business caused its eventual downfall. Woodhouse resigned as Director of Operations after a series of disagreements and Stirling ceased to take an active part in 1972.

Great Britain 75 
In mid-1970s, Stirling became increasingly worried that an "undemocratic event" would occur and decided to organise a private army to overthrow the government. He created an organisation called Great Britain 75 and recruited members from the aristocratic clubs in Mayfair; these were mainly ex-military men, and often former SAS members. The plan was that in the event of civil unrest resulting in the breakdown of normal Government operations, they would take over its running. He described this in detail in an interview from 1974, part of which is featured in Adam Curtis's documentary The Mayfair Set, episode 1: "Who Pays Wins".

In August 1974, before Stirling was ready to go public with GB75, the pacifist magazine Peace News obtained and published his plans. His biographer Alan Hoe disputed the newspaper's disparaging portrayal of Stirling as a right-wing 'Colonel Blimp'.

Undermining trades unionism 
During the mid to late 1970s, Stirling created a secret organisation designed to undermine trades unionism from within. He recruited like-minded individuals from within the trade union movement, with the express intention that they should cause as much trouble during conferences as permissible. One such member was Kate Losinska, who was Head of the Civil and Public Services Association. Funding for this "operation" came primarily from his friend Sir James Goldsmith.

Later life 
Stirling transferred to the Regular Army Reserve of Officers in 1947. Stirling was granted the honorary rank of Lt. Col as a reservist, a rank that he retained on his retirement in 1965. Stirling was the founder of the Capricorn Africa Society, a society for promoting Africa free from racial discrimination. Founded in 1949, while Africa was still under colonial rule, it had its high point at the 1956 Salima Conference. However, because of his emphasis on a qualified and highly elitist voting franchise, similar to Disraeli's "fancy franchises", educated Africans were divided on it. Consequently, the society's attempt to deal with the problem of different levels of social development in a non-racial way was ineffective, although it received a surprising validation when the South African Communist Party used Stirling's multi-racial elitist model for its 1955 "Congress Alliance" when taking over the African National Congress of South Africa. Stirling resigned as Chairman of the Society in 1959.

In September 1967 Len Deighton wrote an article in The Sunday Times Magazine about Operation Bigamy. The following year Stirling was awarded "substantial damages" in a libel action about the article.

Honours 
Stirling was awarded the Distinguished Service Order in recognition of gallant and distinguished service in the Middle East on 24 February 1942, appointed an Officer of the Order of the British Empire in recognition of gallant and distinguished service in the field on 14 November 1946 and appointed a Knight Bachelor in the 1990 New Year Honours for services to the military.

in 1984 the new base of the SAS was renamed Stirling Lines (from Bradbury Lines) in his honour.

In 2002 the SAS memorial, a statue of Stirling standing on a rock, was unveiled on the Hill of Row near his family's estate at Park of Keir. Two bronze plaques were stolen from the statue sometime around the end of May 2014. The current Laird of the Keir estate is his nephew Archie Stirling, a millionaire businessman and former Scots Guards officer.

In popular culture 
He was depicted by Connor Swindells in the 2022 television historical drama SAS: Rogue Heroes.

See also 
 List of French paratrooper units

References

Further reading 
 Significant Scots: biography of Sir David Stirling
 Virginia Cowles. The Phantom Major: The Story of David Stirling and the SAS Regiment (Collins, 1958)  
 Gavin Mortimer. Stirling's Men: The inside history of the SAS in World War Two (Cassell, 2004)  
 Gavin Mortimer. Stirling's Desert Triumph: The SAS Egyptian Airfield Raids 1942; Osprey Raid Series #49 (Osprey Publishing, 2015) 

1915 births
1990 deaths
Scottish military personnel
People from Perthshire
British Army personnel of World War II
Scottish Roman Catholics
Prisoners of war held at Colditz Castle
Companions of the Distinguished Service Order
Knights Bachelor
Lecropt
Officers of the Order of the British Empire
People educated at Ampleforth College
Scots Guards officers
Special Air Service officers
British Army Commandos officers
Place of death missing
British World War II prisoners of war
World War II prisoners of war held by Italy